Waltraud Kretzschmar ( Hermann then Czelake, 1 February 1948 in Kloster Lehnin – 7 February 2018) was an East German handball player who competed in the 1976 Summer Olympics and in the 1980 Summer Olympics. In the 1970s, she was considered the best and most successful handball player in the world.

In 1976 she won the silver medal with the East German team. She played three matches including the final and scored eight goals. Four years later she won the bronze medal as a member of the East German. She played one match and scored one goal.

Kretzschmar married her coach, Peter Kretzschmar, in 1972. They lived in Schöneiche near Berlin. She died unexpectedly on 7 February 2018 and was buried in Leipzig in a family grave. Stefan Kretzschmar is their son.

References

External links
profile

1948 births
2018 deaths
German female handball players
Handball players at the 1976 Summer Olympics
Handball players at the 1980 Summer Olympics
Olympic handball players of East Germany
Olympic silver medalists for East Germany
Olympic bronze medalists for East Germany
Olympic medalists in handball
Medalists at the 1980 Summer Olympics
Medalists at the 1976 Summer Olympics
Sportspeople from Brandenburg
People from Potsdam-Mittelmark
20th-century German women
21st-century German women